Super Fake Nice is an EP by American pop rock band sElf, released on July 29, 2014. In addition to the physical CD release, in October 2014 a limited vinyl run was made available through El Camino Media. It was the band’s first release since the B-side compilation Porno, Mint & Grime was released more than 9 years prior.

Track listing

References 

2014 EPs
Self (band) albums